Cullison is a surname. Notable people with the surname include:

Bob Cullison (1936–2021), American politician
Bonnie Cullison (born 1954), American teacher, labor official, and politician
James B. Cullison (1857–1936), American judge

See also
Collison (surname)

English-language surnames